Plionoma is a genus of beetles in the family Cerambycidae, containing the following species:

 Plionoma basalis (Horn, 1894)
 Plionoma rubens (Casey, 1891)
 Plionoma suturalis (LeConte, 1858)

References

Trachyderini
Cerambycidae genera